Boulette may refer to 

 Frikadeller, flat, pan-fried meatballs
 Michael Joseph Boulette, American priest and auxiliary bishop
 Harry Boulette, Canadian politician
 Boulette de Cambrai and Boulette d'Avesnes, French cheeses
 La Boulette, 2006 French single by Diam's

See also 
 Bulette (disambiguation)